Verner Trygve "V.T." Jordahl (October 26, 1898 – September 27, 1984) was an Evangelical Lutheran Church (ELC) District President; he served as a U.S. Army Chaplain, on the Luther College Board of Regents, and was the ELC Director of Service to Military Personnel.

Jordahl was born October 26, 1898 in Norway Lake, Minnesota as a second generation immigrant from Norway. He retired in Sun City, Arizona. He died on September 27, 1984 at his summer home in Decorah, Iowa. He received his Bachelor of Arts (B.A.) degree from Luther College in 1922, where he had also attended preparatory school. He then attended Luther Seminary in Saint Paul, Minnesota and received his Bachelor of Theology in 1925.

Pastoral career

In 1925, Jordahl accepted a call to be pastor of Central Lutheran Church in Dallas, Texas. He was at Central Lutheran for eight years. After turning down five calls over many years from other churches to be their pastor, he finally accepted a call in May 1933 to Our Savior’s Lutheran Church in Cleveland, Ohio.

Military service

On September 25, 1943, V.T. enlisted as a U.S. Army Chaplain. He attended Chaplain’s school at Harvard University. His first assignment was as a chaplain on transport ships, which would bring troops to and from battle. His next chaplain assignment was to a Prisoner of War (POW) camp in Alva, Oklahoma, where there were about 4,800 POW’s, predominantly German Nazi’s. He received commendations for his work here to establish contact between POW’s and their relatives in the U.S. He also worked to identify Lutheran clergymen (conscripted into the Wehrmacht) among the POW’s in order to establish congregations. His discharge from the U.S. Army was April 28th, 1946.

In July 1946 V.T. accepted a call as pastor of  St. Olaf’s Lutheran Church in Bode, Iowa.

Bishop and Service to Military Personnel

In October 1948, he was elected bishop (also called district president) of the South Central District of the Evangelical Lutheran Church (ELC). This district was, at the time, the largest district in the ELC, stretching from Iowa down through Texas. He served in this position for 11 years and during this time he received an honorary Doctorate from Luther College.

In 1959, V.T. was appointed by the president of the ELC, Fredrik A. Schiotz, to serve as the director of the newly formed agency, Service to Military Personnel. (In 1960, the ELC joined with other Lutheran churches to form the American Lutheran Church.) The position was the bishop to all Lutheran chaplains in the U.S. military and entailed coordinating all U.S. Lutheran chaplaincy operations around the world. This office was based in Minneapolis and the family lived in Golden Valley, MN.

Career Timeline
 1925 – Senior Pastor, Central Lutheran Church; Dallas, Texas
 1933 – Senior Pastor, Our Saviour's Lutheran Church; Cleveland, Ohio
 1943 – U.S. Army Chaplain
 1946 – Pastor, St. Olaf's Lutheran Church; Bode, Iowa
 1948 – District President/Bishop, South Central District, Evangelical Lutheran Church
 1959 – Director, Service to Military Personnel, Evangelical Lutheran Church; Minneapolis, Minnesota

Family
V.T. was the middle of seven children: Dagmar, Esther, Harold, V.T., Scriver, Nils, and Solveig. V.T. and his siblings were the first generation of their Jordahl ancestors born in the United States, as father Daniel Christopherson (known as D.C.) was born in Jordalsgrenda, Norway and his mother, Johanna, was born in Red Wing, Minnesota. She died when V.T. was only six years old. This made V.T. a second generation immigrant. On September 25, 1925, V.T. was married to Norma Resida Johnson at Madison Lutheran Church in Ridgeway, Iowa. V.T. and Norma knew each other growing up since they both attended and were confirmed at Madison Lutheran. The first three Jordahl children (Rodger, Daniel, and Norma) were born in Dallas between 1926 and 1929. The last Jordahl child, Vern Truman was born in Cleveland in the mid-1930s.

See also
 Evangelical Lutheran Church
 Luther College (Iowa)
 Jordalsgrenda, Norway

References

American people of Norwegian descent
1898 births
1984 deaths
Evangelical Lutheran Church in America bishops
Luther College (Iowa) alumni
People from Kandiyohi County, Minnesota
Lutheran chaplains
20th-century Lutheran bishops
People from Humboldt County, Iowa
People from Decorah, Iowa
Luther Seminary alumni
People from Sun City, Arizona